Ekarma Strait is a stretch of water in the Sea of Okhotsk that separates Ekarma at the northwest and Shiashkotan at the southeast. The islands are part of the Kuril Islands chain in the Russian Far East.

References 

Straits of the Kuril Islands

Shiashkotan